9Rush is an Australian free-to-air digital television multichannel, launched by the Nine Network on 5 April 2020. The channel is a joint venture with Warner Bros. Discovery Networks Asia-Pacific Pte. Ltd (which also supplies its programming) and is broadcast on Channel 96 across Nine's metropolitan markets. The target audience are males between the ages of 25 to 54.

In March 2022, Discovery, Inc. launched the similarly-named Rush channel in New Zealand, which shares some programming and common ownership with 9Rush.

Programming 
9Rush majorly broadcasts adventure and high adrenaline reality programming. Programming shows come from Warner Bros. Discovery, including shows from United States, United Kingdom and Canada.

Original programming

Acquired programming

Current programming

 Alaska: The Last Frontier
 Bear Grylls: Face the Wild
 Bering Sea Gold
 Cops UK
 Diesel Brothers
 Dirty Jobs Down Under
 Garage Squad
 Gold Rush
 Homestead Rescue
 How It's Made
 Kindig Customs
 The Last Alaskans
 Live PD
 Man vs. Wild
 Million Dollar Car Hunters
 Million Dollar Garage
 Misfit Garage
 Naked and Afraid
 Overhaulin'
 Railroad Alaska
Resto my Ride Australia
 Running Wild with Bear Grylls
 Tanked
 Top Gear
 Traffic Cops
 Treasure Quest: Snake Island
 Treehouse Masters
 Shifting Gears
 Street Outlaws
 Wheeler Dealers

See also

Nine Network
9HD
9Gem
9Go!
9Life
Extra
Warner Bros. Discovery
Rush (New Zealand)

References

External links

Nine Network
Warner Bros. Discovery Asia-Pacific
Digital terrestrial television in Australia
English-language television stations in Australia
Men's mass media
Men's interest channels
Television channels and networks about cars
Television channels and stations established in 2020
2020 establishments in Australia
Joint ventures